The John and Ellen Bowman House is a house located in northeast Portland, Oregon, United States. 

It was built in 1915–16 on six lots and was designed by Ellis F. Lawrence. The house is constructed mostly of concrete block covered with textured stucco and was estimated to cost $35,000.

It is listed on the National Register of Historic Places.

See also
 National Register of Historic Places listings in Northeast Portland, Oregon

References

External links
 

1915 establishments in Oregon
Colonial Revival architecture in Oregon
Houses completed in 1915
Houses on the National Register of Historic Places in Portland, Oregon
Irvington, Portland, Oregon